Archery was contested from 14 December to 15 December at the 1978 Asian Games in Hua Mark Sport Complex, Bangkok, Thailand. The competition included only recurve events.

Japan finished first in the medal table  by winning three gold medals.

Medalists

Medal table

References 
 Medalists
 Men's team medalists
 Women's team medalists

External links 
 Olympic Council of Asia

 
1978 Asian Games events
1978
Asian Games
International archery competitions hosted by Thailand